Bob Boniface is an American automobile and industrial designer who has worked for Chrysler and General Motors.

Background 
Born in Youngstown, Ohio into a family of eight children, Boniface began drawing cars at the age of four.

Education  

Boniface graduated from Vanderbilt University in 1987 with a bachelor’s degree in Psychology and Economics. In 1993, he graduated with a bachelor’s of fine arts degree in Transportation Design from the College of Creative Studies in Detroit, MI.

Chrysler 

Boniface was the Chief Designer at Daimler Chrysler’s Advanced Product Design Studio. He directed the architectural design of the minivan Sto-N-Go seating as well as Chrysler’s rear wheel drive 300C. He was also the lead designer for the 2002 Jeep Liberty, 1998 Dodge Intrepid and the 1996 Dodge Intrepid ESX Hybrid Concept Car.

General Motors 

Boniface went on to direct the interior and exterior design of the 2011 Chevrolet Volt production vehicle. Boniface appeared in the movie Revenge of the Electric Car.

Boniface later became Cadillac's director of exterior design, where he oversaw the design of the 2014 Cadillac CTS, 2015 Cadillac ATS Coupe, 2016 Cadillac ATS V, 2016 Cadillac CTS V, 2016 Cadillac CT6, and 2016 Cadillac XT5.

Boniface won 2014 Detroit Free Press Automotive Leadership award for design.

As Director of Global Buick Design, Boniface oversaw the design of the 2022 Buick Wildcat EV concept.

References

http://www.autonews.com/article/20140929/OEM03/309299987/bob-boniface-and-the-art-and-science-of-designing-cadillacs
http://www.dispatch.com/content/stories/classifieds/cars/2015/08_August/boniface
http://www.nytimes.com/2014/08/17/automobiles/autoreviews/2015-cadillac-ats-coupe-review.html
http://www.automobilemag.com/auto_shows/los_angeles/2014/1501-2016-cadillac-ats-v-outmuscling-the-m3/
https://www.automotivehalloffame.org/honoree/bob-boniface/
https://news.gm.com/newsroom.detail.html/Pages/news/us/en/2022/jun/0601-wildcat.html

External links

American automobile designers
Artists from Youngstown, Ohio
Year of birth missing (living people)
Living people
Vanderbilt University alumni
College for Creative Studies alumni
General Motors designers